Bled Strategic Forum (BSF) is an annual international conference organized since 2006. It is hosted in Bled, Slovenia. Its aim is to be a platform to express contrasting opinions on modern society and its future. It's a leading conference of leaders of Central and South-East Europe. The forum was initiated by the Government of Slovenia.

Notable speakers 
 Josep Borrell, High Representative of the European Union, Europe's great responsibility, 2020
 Michelle Bachelet, United Nations High Commissioner for Human Rights
 María Fernanda Espinosa, President of the 73rd United Nations General Assembly
 Miroslav Lajčák, President of the 72nd United Nations General Assembly

Topics 
 2021: Future of Europe
 2020: Neighbours – Regions – Global World: Partners or Rivals?: Challenges and Opportunities in the Post-COVID–19 World
 2019: (Re)sources of (In)stability
 2018: Bridging the Divide
 2017: New Reality
 2016: Safeguarding the Future
 2015: Visions of New Partnerships
 2014: Power of Trust
 2013: A Changing Europe in a Changing World
 2012: Europe and the Reshaped Global Order
 2011: The Power of Future
 2010: Global Outlook for the Next Decade
 2009: The Politics of Economic Crisis: Redefining Economic and Geopolitical Landscapes in Europe and Eurasia
 2008: Energy and Climate Change: Si.nergy for the Future
 2007: European Union 2020: Enlarging and Integrating
 2006: Political Reform and Sustainable Development in the South Caucasus

References 

Bled
Events in Slovenia
Global economic conferences
2006 establishments in Slovenia